The Puli is a small-medium breed of Hungarian herding and livestock guarding dog known for its long, corded coat. The tight curls of the coat appear similar to dreadlocks. A similar-looking, but much larger breed – also Hungarian – is the Komondor.
Plural form of Puli is Pulik in Hungarian.

Description

Appearance 

The Puli is a solid-colored dog that is usually black. Other less common coat colors are white, gray, or cream (off-white or fakó in Hungarian). A variety of the cream-coated dogs have black masks. The white Pulis are not albino, nor do they have blue eyes. They commonly have dark pigment, black pads, black noses and black pigment inside the mouth. The white gene is recessive to the pure black gene. The breed standard for females is about 16.5 inches (42 cm) at the withers and 17 inches for males.  Females weigh 23-25 pounds and males slightly more. The coat of some Puli dogs can be different with either thinner or thicker cords which can be flat or round depending on the texture of the coat and the balance of undercoat to outer coat.

The coat is the result of a controlled matting process. Thin, rope-like corded coats are desired and the grooming should control the coat towards the forming of thinner ropes. The Puli's coat needs considerable grooming to keep its cords clean, neat, and attractive. With age, the coat can become quite long, even reaching the ground. Alternatively, the coat can be trimmed short regularly for easy maintenance although the corded coat is what attracts many people to the breed. Contrary to some beliefs, the coat of a healthy puli will grow out again after trimming. This breed has little to no shedding.

Temperament 
The Puli is an intelligent and active dog. It needs obedience training while still young. If a Puli gets enough exercise, it can live in the city,
but they do best when not kept indoor pets in small living spaces. Pulis kept indoors need a lot of exercise to use up their energy, or they can become either shy or overactive. They need to get the kind of exercise they were created for. Pulis are best kept in a house with a garden. Cozy and very friendly especially towards children, they are sensitive and prone to resentment.

Activities

Pulis are intelligent, agile dogs. Despite their bulky appearance and very thick coat, they are very fast, agile, and able to change directions instantly and are obedient enough to train for athletic competition. They are devoted and form close bonds with their owners.

The breed is intelligent and can do well in obedience training if begun early. Traditionally, the Puli dog breed was used as a herding dog and sometimes even as a livestock guarding dog, as well. They make very good guard dogs, since they are very protective of their masters and territory. The Puli is sensitive, fun-loving, courageous, but also, at times, tough and headstrong.

They are loyal to their owners and wary of strangers. They are highly active and keep a playful, puppy-like behavior their entire lives. They need a lot of exercise and free space, preferably outdoors. They can be trained and housebroken, but Pulis are generally not very well suited as city or indoor pets. When restricted to closed spaces for long periods of times, they grow restless and may develop unwanted personality traits, such as becoming hyperactive or, instead, increasingly aloof and lazy.

As a working dog, the Puli is very obedient, focused and determined when assigned a task. Some of them are used as police dogs. As a livestock guarding dog, they are fiercely protective of their territory and flock, and, despite their relatively small size, will fearlessly try to scare and drive any intruder away; however, they very rarely inflict any real injuries.

As a family dog, they make good security dogs and faithful family guardians. They can be very friendly and playful, even in old age. They regard their family as their flock, and will keep their distance until they are sure a stranger is not a threat. When annoyed, they may attack without warning, so a considerable distance may be advisable for strangers. They can be extremely independent and obstinate, and only accept strong-willed individuals as master.

Pulis can compete in dog agility trials, obedience, Rally obedience, showmanship, flyball, tracking, and herding events. Herding instincts and trainability can be measured at noncompetitive herding tests. Pulis exhibiting basic herding instincts can be trained to compete in herding trials.

Training 
Pulis are valued for their energy and determination which is a result of their sheepdog history. Every Puli is a natural shepherd and instinctively knows how to herd a flock of sheep or livestock even if they have been raised as a family dog and have never been trained to do it. It is advisable to start training the Puli early in age, especially in obedience. They are very independent, strong-willed, and difficult to train in adulthood.

History 

The Magyars probably brought the Puli to Hungary in the 9th Century when they invaded westwards from Siberia, and it has been a sheepdog on the Hungarian plain since then. It is the ancestor of the Poodle. The breed was first studied by Dr Emil Raitsitz from Hungary's veterinary college in the 1920s.

The Puli would commonly work together with the much larger, white Komondor, a Hungarian breed of (solely) livestock guardian dog. The Komondor is a large, solidly built dog, around 30 inches tall. The Komondor (or several Komondors if there was a large amount of livestock) guarded the sheep or cattle mostly at night, while the Puli herded and guarded them during the day.

When wolves or bears attacked the livestock, the Puli would alert the pack and the Komondors would come and fight the intruders. Pulis can be good at fighting off wolves, because the thick coat protects their skin from being bitten. The Komondors usually rested during daytime but at night walked around the flock, constantly moving, patrolling the area.

Nomadic shepherds of the Hungarian plains valued their herding dogs, paying as much as a year's salary for a Puli.

Although the coats may look slightly similar, the Puli has never worked in water and the Puli's coat does not grow continuously in the same fashion as a corded Poodle's coat once the cords are formed.

Possibly the Puli's ancestors are ancient Hungarian shepherd dogs. Travelers brought the Puli with them to the Carpathian basin, to help organize the flocks and herd the stallions of the area. Large Komondor or Kuvasz were used for guarding the flock. The Puli was also a suitable guard for flock protection but was primarily used for herding the animals. Around the beginning of the 20th century, a real turning point for the breed came when it was rediscovered but no longer used much as a sheepdog; extensive shepherding was replaced by intensive farming. The Puli's role was reduced in the life of the flock. Although their traditional duty was kept, they started to fulfill jobs that were convenient in the circumstances of their owner: they became house dogs. After World War II, the breed became a less popular pet; even now, the breed has not been able to regain the popularity it previously enjoyed.

The U.S. Department of Agriculture imported four purebred Pulis in 1935 to Beltsville, Maryland as part of an experiment when trying to help American agriculturists concerned with the problem of herding dogs which sometimes killed the animals to which they had been entrusted to control. The Pulis were bred among themselves and crossed with the German Shepherd, the Chow Chow and perhaps with two Turkish sheepdogs which were quartered there at the time. On the tests given by researchers there, Pulis scored, on the average, between 75 and 85, where other herding breeds, scored in the range of 12 to 14. Because tests were inconclusive, they were never published. When WWII broke out, the Pulis were auctioned off to professional breeders, and, it is thought that, it is from these four dogs and their progeny that history of the Puli in the United States began.

Notable Pulis

In 1978, a Puli called Cinko Duda Csebi won the world exposition organized by the Fédération Cynologique Internationale. The Mexican-born dog was owned by breeder Roberto Hernández Ávalos.

The dog known as "The Auditor" is assumed to be a Puli.  It lived in the contaminated Berkeley Pit copper mine in Butte, Montana. Notable for being one of the few things that could live and thrive in such a place, in time it became a sort of mascot for the town. After The Auditor died, several memorials were erected celebrating its existence.

Facebook CEO Mark Zuckerberg has a white Puli named Beast.

In the 1960s, writer Harlan Ellison adopted a Puli named Ahbhu and wrote about him in the 1975 Hugo-winning novelette "The Deathbird" (part of the 1975 collection Deathbird Stories). In addition, Ahbhu appeared in the 1969 short story "A Boy And His Dog" as a predecessor to the main character's telepathic dog Blood.

American novelist T.C. Boyle used to own several Pulis and still has one. One of them, named "Kutya" (Hungarian for "dog"), is commemorated in his novel The Harder They Come.

Puli pictures

See also
 Hungarian dog breeds
 Dogs portal
 List of dog breeds

References

External links

Dog breeds originating in Hungary
Herding dogs
Hungarian words and phrases
FCI breeds
Rare dog breeds